Terje Grøstad (16 December 1925 – 10 July 2011) was a Norwegian painter. graphic artist and illustrator.

Biography
He was born in Drammen in Buskerud and lived in Flatdal in Telemark from the 1950s. 
He attended the Norwegian National Academy of Craft and Art Industry  (1945) where he trained under Karl Høgberg. 
He was a student at the  Norwegian National Academy of Fine Arts under Per Krohg (1947–50). He made his debut in 1948 at the Larvik Kunstforening.

He painted altarpieces in churches including at Havøysund Church and Tana Church and at Brevik Church.

Books illustrated by him (using woodcut technique) include Aust or Markom (1968 edition of Sven Moren's book from 1909), Dølen (1971–1972 reprint of Aasmund O. Vinje's magazine originally issued from 1858 to 1870), Den fjerde nattevakt (1972 edition of Johan Falkberget's novel) and Vann av klippen (2007, Eyvind Skeie). 

His work is owned by the National Gallery of Norway and the National Museum of Fine Arts of Sweden.
He was awarded the King's Medal of Merit in gold in 1996. He died in 2011.

References

Other sources
 Arvid Møller  (1995) Terje Grøstad Tresnitt 1950-1995 (Grøndahl og Dreyers Forlag) 

1925 births
2011 deaths
People from Drammen
People from Telemark
20th-century Norwegian painters
21st-century Norwegian painters
Norwegian illustrators
Recipients of the King's Medal of Merit in gold